The LG Banter (codename AX265) was released on March 23, 2009  and is a successor to the LG Scoop. It has side-slider design and a 1.3-megapixel camera. There are also interchangeable faceplates with two colors: one green and one black. The Banter has two carriers: Alltel Wireless and U.S. Cellular, one with a price of $20 and another one for $50.

References

Banter
Mobile phones introduced in 2009